This is a list of tallest skyscrapers and supertalls in Southeast Asia with a height of at least 250m. They are ranked by structural height.

Tallest buildings

Buildings proposed or under construction

Timeline of tallest buildings in Southeast Asia

References

Tallest buildings